Menyinkwa is located in Kenya, Nyanza Province, Kisii county along Kisii-Kilgoris road approximately 5 km or 5 minute drive from Kisii town  It is a neighbourhood of middle-class inhabitants who are Abaganda, Abanyamoyio, Abao'riango and some Abanyamasicho. The majority of the inhabitants are Kisiis from other regions and locals who are actively involved in successful business and farming. Notable businessmen include Ouru senior, Ngesa, Mrefu, John, Omonde, Jomo ontita (Highway bar) among others. It is a hub of activities with bars, shopping centres, self-help chamas, youth organizations and football clubs; notably Menyinkwa zone FC boda boda team

Origin
The name 'Menyinkwa' originates from a plant called 'Omonyikwa' which grew naturally in large scale at the area. People from far came here to look for the leaves of the plant for its medicinal use.

Legacies 
Talking of the popular kisii saying "Motembe nsago nchiao" then you would never go wrong without mentioning Menyinkwa as the Omotembe tree which held cure for mumps once grew here albeit it is now extinct .

References

Kisii County